Rose Knox (née Markward; November 18, 1857 – September 27, 1950) was an American businesswoman, who ran the Knox Gelatin Factory in Johnstown, New York, United States, after her husband died.  She won wide respect as one of the leading businesswomen of her time.

Early life and education 
Knox was one of three girls born to David and Amanda Markward of Mansfield, Ohio. In the late 1870s, Rose and her family moved to Gloversville, New York, where she lived until 1896. Rose met her husband, Charles Briggs Knox, in 1881: they married on February 15, 1883. Together Rose and Charles had three children: one girl who died in childhood, and two sons, one of whom died in early adulthood. In 1896 the family moved to Johnstown to set up a gelatin business after Charles Knox watched Rose making homemade gelatin in her kitchen. The Charles B. Knox Gelatin Company was located in a large four story factory building. Mr. and Mrs. Charles Knox were very close: Charles shared all his business affairs with his wife, making them partners in the business. Rose wrote recipe booklets promoting Knox's gelatin product, over a million of which were distributed each year. Progressive for his time, Mr. Knox also allocated his wife a weekly allowance which she could do with as she pleased. This taught Rose how to handle and budget money, which came in handy when she was running the gelatin business herself.

Career 
Knox became a businesswoman when her husband died in 1908, taking over his Knox Gelatin Factory. She made notable changes in the business. The first day she was there she permanently closed the back door of the factory, stating that all men and women were equal and that was the way she was going to be treating them: there was no need to have two separate doors. She also requested one of her husband's top executives to resign after he was overheard saying he would not work for a woman. Throughout the years to come, Mrs. Knox made many other changes. One of the most famous things she did was to create a five-day work week for her workers, and she also gave them two weeks of paid vacation, something that was unheard of before. Mrs. Knox survived the Depression without having to release any of her workers. She was a Presbyterian in religion and a Republican in politics. She died aged 93, in 1950.

Honors 
Rose Knox, as one of the first business women in New York State, received many honors in her lifetime. In 1918, it was said that Rose Knox was one of the country's "most successful business women." She became the first woman on the board of directors of the American Grocery Manufacturers Association in 1929. In 1937, Mrs. Knox was voted as the woman who had contributed the most to American business by the New York State Federation of Business and Professional Women. And in 1950, the story of her life was told on "Cavalcade of America" which was broadcast from New York. Recently, in March 2007, she was honored during Women's History Month as a New York State Woman of Distinction.

Works and publications 
Knox's gelatine : 70 easy delicious desserts made from Knox's sparkling calves foot gelatine, the new granulated package, 1896
Food economy; recipes for left-overs and plain desserts, 1917

References 

1857 births
1950 deaths
American businesspeople
American food writers